Golestan Rural District is a rural district (dehestan) in the Central District of Falavarjan County, Isfahan Province, Iran. At the 2006 census, its population was 12,431, in 3,247 families.  The rural district has 9 villages.

References 

Rural Districts of Isfahan Province
Falavarjan County